Wallaconchis nangkauriensis is a species of air-breathing sea slug, a shell-less marine pulmonate gastropod mollusk in the family Onchidiidae.<ref name="WoRMS">{{WRMS species|1259048|Wallaconchis nangkauriensis' (Plate, 1893)||April 30, 2022}}</ref>

References

 Dayrat, B. (2009) Review of the current knowledge of the systematics of Onchidiidae (Mollusca: Gastropoda: Pulmonata) with a checklist of nominal species''. Zootaxa 2068: 1–26

Onchidiidae
Gastropods described in 1893